Fahd Ballan (22 March 1933 – 24 December 1997) was a popular Syrian Druze singer and actor. Like most of his generation of artists who started their show business careers in the early sixties he was exposed to a world of influences of those decades of music glory. His voice and looks made him a symbol of masculinity and won him many acting roles in his youth.

Fahd Ballan traveled to Egypt and worked with Farid al-Atrash. He married actress Mariam Fakhr Eddine and had an acting career. At least one of his tracks (Ma Aqdarshi Ala Kidah ) is done in Egyptian dialect. Most of his songs are performed in a Hourani dialect typical of Southern Syria and Northern Jordan. One track is done in formal Arabic (Jassa El Tabibo Liya Nabadhi). Fahd Ballan had an amazingly strong and beautiful voice that used to shadow the soundtrack music. Many people think some of his songs including "Larchab Haddak Yal Motor" and "Irkibna 3al Houssan" constitute the basis for the type of Arabic music that was later known as "songs from the mounts". Most of his popular songs can be found on YouTube.

References

Bibliography 
Zuhur, Sherifa (2000) Asmahan's secrets: woman, war and song, University of Texas Press

1933 births
1997 deaths
Syrian Druze
20th-century Syrian male singers
People from as-Suwayda